Fort Wadsworth was a station on the demolished South Beach Branch of the Staten Island Railway, near the historic Fort Wadsworth. It had two side platforms and two tracks, and was located at Fingerboard Road.

This station was abandoned when the SIRT discontinued passenger service on the South Beach Branch to Wentworth Avenue at midnight on March 31, 1953, because of city-operated bus competition.

The unused station, overgrown with weeds, remained in place until the 1970s. The location where the station and tracks previously existed, at what is currently the intersection of Tompkins Avenue and Lyman Avenue in Rosebank/Fort Wadsworth, is now occupied by a collection of town homes that are noticeably newer than the surrounding residences.  The path of the former track leading to South Beach, at a lower grade, is now occupied by a power substation.

References

External links
 Gary Owen’s S.I.R.T. South Beach Line Page

South Beach Branch stations
1886 establishments in New York (state)
Railway stations in the United States opened in 1886
Railway stations closed in 1953
1953 disestablishments in New York (state)